Reverse echo and reverse reverb are sound effects created as the result of recording an echo or reverb effect of an audio recording played backwards. The original recording is then played forwards accompanied by the recording of the echoed or reverberated signal which now precedes the original signal. The process produces a swelling effect preceding and during playback.

Development
Guitarist and producer Jimmy Page claims to have invented the effect, stating that he originally developed the method when recording the single "Ten Little Indians" with The Yardbirds in 1967. He later used it on a number of Led Zeppelin tracks, including "You Shook Me", "Whole Lotta Love", and their cover of "When the Levee Breaks". In an interview he gave to Guitar World magazine in 1993, Page explained:

Despite Page's claims, an earlier example of the effect can distinctly be heard towards the end of the 1966 Lee Mallory single "That's the Way It's Gonna Be", produced by Curt Boettcher.

Usage in music
Jimmy Page of Led Zeppelin used this effect in the bridge of "Whole Lotta Love". Another early example is found in "Alucard" from the eponymous Gentle Giant album (1970), although usage was somewhat common throughout the 1970s.

Reverse reverb is commonly used in shoegaze, particularly by such bands as My Bloody Valentine and Spacemen 3.
It is also often used as a lead-in to vocal passages in hardstyle music, and various forms of EDM and pop music.  The reverse reverb is applied to the first word or syllable of the vocal for a build-up effect or other-worldly sound.

Metallica used the effect in the song "Fade To Black" on James Hetfield's vocals in their 1984 album Ride The Lightning. The effect was also employed by Genesis (on Phil Collins’ snare drum) at the end of the song “Deep in the Motherload” on the 1978 album “And Then There Were Three”.

Use in other media 

Reverse reverb has been used in filmmaking and television production for an otherworldly effect on voices, especially in horror movies.

Reverse reverb was also used in the company logo for production company CBS Studios.

References

Acoustics
Musical techniques
Audio engineering